Congregation Agudas Achim Anshei Sfard, more commonly known as The Adams Street Shul, is an Orthodox Jewish synagogue located at 168 Adams Street in the village of Nonantum in Newton, Massachusetts.  Built in 1912 for a congregation established in 1911, it is home to Newton's oldest Jewish congregation, and one of the oldest in the region still occupying its original synagogue.  Its Romanesque Revival building was listed on the National Register of Historic Places on March 16, 1990.

Architecture and history
The Adams Street Shul is located on the north side of Adams Street a short way east of Watertown Street (Massachusetts Route 16), the main road through Nonantum Village.  It is a single-story brick structure, three bays wide, with a pair of round-arch windows flanking the main entrance, which is also set in a round-arch opening.  Above the entrance is an oculus window with a Star of David.

The synagogue was built in 1912 by a Jewish congregation established in 1911.  It was Newton's only synagogue until 1937, when Temple Emanuel was completed on Ward Street.  It was built with significant contribution of labor by the congregation, which included skilled craftsmen.  The Torah ark and bema were added in 1924, the work of a Jewish-Ukrainian craftsman, who also created the Vilna Shul ark.  The interior has seen only modest alterations since its construction.  The congregation has remained small but steady, with many families having multiple generations of membership.

See also
 National Register of Historic Places listings in Newton, Massachusetts

References

External links
  Adams Street Shul website

National Register of Historic Places in Newton, Massachusetts
Religious buildings and structures in Newton, Massachusetts
Jewish organizations established in 1911
Orthodox synagogues in Massachusetts
Synagogues on the National Register of Historic Places in Massachusetts
Synagogues completed in 1912
1911 establishments in Massachusetts
Modern Orthodox synagogues in the United States